Chester (1874–1888) was an Australian thoroughbred racehorse and a leading sire. He was the leading sire in Australia on four occasions.

Breeding
Chester, on the side of his sire, was a third generation colonial-bred Australian stallion. Chester's sire was the influential stallion Yattendon, who was serving mares while still racing. His dam Lady Chester (GB) was by Stockwell from Austrey by Harkaway. Stockwell was out of the breed-shaping broodmare, Pocahontas.

Racing career
Chester's illustrious racing career began on New Year's Day 1877 in the Sydney Tattersall's Two Year Old Stakes, in which he came a close second to Viscount. After that, Chester won three consecutive races, all in the same week, and was spelled to await his three-year-old season. He was ridden in these three wins by jockey, G.Donnelly. Chester was then sold to James White.

As a flying three-year-old, Chester won seven of his ten starts, setting three race records. He placed short-head second in the AJC Derby. Two starts after the AJC Derby, he started in the VRC Derby, he won, and claimed a track record – 2:43 – a record that held itself until 1897 by Amberite. His next race, just three days after his Derby triumph, was the gruelling two-mile (3,200m) Melbourne Cup over a slippery, muddy track. Chester held on to beat the lightly weighted Savanaka by a half-head in the record time of 3:33½.

He took a long and deserving spell after his spring campaign, and didn't return to racing until the April 1878. During his return, he won the AJC Autumn Stakes and two days later took second to Savanaka in the two-mile Sydney Cup, giving Savanaka twelve pounds. He won the AJC Cumberland Stakes over two miles, the next day winning the three-mile AJC Plate.

Lame for the majority of his next season, Chester ran twice. He won the AJC Spring Stakes over 12 furlongs, and came third in the AJC Craven Plate. A year later, he ventured out for the VRC Melbourne Stakes, which he won, despite being lame. He was entered in the Melbourne Cup two days later, assigned with top weight of 9 st 6 lb (60 kg), but sore and out of condition for the two-miler, he placed sixth, with yet another Yattendon son, Grand Flaneur, taking the money.

Stud record
By the time Chester had retired to stand at Kirkham Stud, near Camden, his owner, James White, had purchased a number of well-bred colonial broodmares. He began to build up a high-quality broodmare band through the 1880s, including Chester's dam, Lady Chester. White had also purchased Martini-Henry, by Musket, as a stallion for Kirkham, and he used as a cross with Chester daughters with some success. His best son, Abercorn (AJC Derby), defeated Carbine several times. Chester sired 26 stakeswinners for 104 stakeswins, including Camoola (AJC & VRC Derbies), Carlyon, Dreadnought, Stromboli (AJC Derby, Sydney Cup), Titan and Uralla.

Chester led the sire's list in Australia in 1887–88, 1889–90, 1891–92 and 1892–93, the latter two posthumous placings since Chester died on the 21 November 1891, aged seventeen from rupturing his bowel. He was buried at Kirkham Stud.

References

 Chester on Thoroughbred Heritage Site

External links
 Chester's Extended Pedigree

1874 racehorse births
1888 racehorse deaths
Racehorses bred in Australia
Racehorses trained in Australia
Melbourne Cup winners
Victoria Derby winners
Champion Thoroughbred Sires of Australia
Thoroughbred family 8-k